The Kandyan day gecko or Kandyan rock gecko (Cnemaspis kandiana) is a species of diurnal gecko found in Sri Lanka.

Description
Its head is rather elongated; the snout is obtusely pointed, longer than the distance between the eye and the ear opening, l.5 the diameter of the orbit; the forehead is not concave; the ear opening is small and oval. Its body and limbs are rather slender; the hind limbs reach the axilla or the shoulder. Its digits are slender, the basal part is not dilated, scarcely wider than the distal, and with enlarged plates beneath. The snout is covered with suboval keeled granules; the rest of the head is minutely granulate; the rostral is twice as broad as deep, with median emargination and cleft above; the nostrils are pierced between the rostral and three or four nasals; seven or eight upper and as many lower labials are found; the mental is large and triangular, with a truncated posterior angle; numerous small chin-shields pass gradually into the gular granules, which are feebly keeled. The upper surface of its body is covered with small, more or less distinctly keeled granules, intermixed with irregularly scattered, small, keeled tubercles; the flanks are small and widely separated, with spine-like tubercles. Scales on the limbs are keeled. The ventral scales are cycloid and imbricated; those under the neck are keeled, and the others are smooth (or keeled in C. k. tropidogaster'). Males have three or four preanal pores, and on each side three to five femoral pores. The tail is cylindrical, tapering, above with very small keeled scales and annuli of spine-like tubercles, beneath with larger scales, but no transversely dilated median plates. In color, it is brown above, variegated with darker and lighter; these variegations generally form transverse markings on the back and tail; sometimes, a light vertebral band occurs; the spine-like tubercles on the flanks are white; its lower surfaces are light brown or dirty white; the throat is sometimes blackish. From snout to vent, it is 1.4 in long; the tail is 1.5 in.

The type locality is the mountains of Kandy, Sri Lanka.

References

 Annandale, N. 1905 Contributions to Oriental herpetology l. The lizards of the Andamans, with the description of a new gecko and a note on the reproduced tail in Ptychozoon homalocephalum. Journal of the Asiatic Society of Bengal, 73 (supplement) :12-22
 Beddome, R.H. 1870 Descriptions of some new lizards from the Madras Presidency. Madras Monthly J. Med. Sci. 1: 30-35
 Jerdon, T.C. 1853 Catalogue of the Reptiles inhabiting the Peninsula of India. Part 1. J. Asiat. Soc. Bengal  xxii [1853]: 462-479
 Kelaart, E.F. 1852 Ceylon Reptiles. In: Prodomus Faunae Zeylanicae. Vol. 1. Part 3. Colombo, pp. 143–187.
 Kluge A. G. 1993 Gekkonoid Lizard Taxonomy. International Gecko Society, San Diego, 245 pp.
 Rösler, Herbert 1995 Geckos der Welt - Alle Gattungen. Urania, Leipzig, 256 pp.
 Rösler, H. 2000 Kommentierte Liste der rezent, subrezent und fossil bekannten Geckotaxa (Reptilia: Gekkonomorpha). Gekkota 2: 28-153
 Stoliczka, F. 1873 Notes on some Andamese and Nicobarese Reptiles, with the descriptions of three new species of lizards. J. Asiat. Soc. Bengal  42: 162-169

Cnemaspis
Reptiles of Sri Lanka
Endemic fauna of Sri Lanka
Taxa named by Edward Frederick Kelaart
Reptiles described in 1852